Jarler (Latin Jarlerius)  (died August 22, 1255) was a Swedish Dominican monk and Archbishop of Uppsala from 1236 to 1255.

Biography
Jarler was one of the two earliest known Swedish students at the University of Paris.

During his time as archbishop, the Dominican and Franciscan friars settled in Sweden. These orders benefited the Christian awareness among the common populations through their preaching. Cistercians,  the previously order in Sweden,  did not preach. 

In Sweden, the political climate was shaky. In 1247, the house of   Folkung (Folkungaätten) revolted against   King Eric XI of Sweden, resulting in the Battle of Sparrsätra.

In 1247-48, papal delegate Vilhelm av Sabina  was sent to Sweden to investigate the recurring accusations of marriage among priests.   Clerical celibacy was a long-standing Church doctrine. Jarler participated at a church meeting at Skänninge in 1248, where it was decided to consecrate the rule of celibacy, the Church's independence of the King, and finally that the archbishop should be elected through a cathedral chapter and not as previously by the King personally. The rules established an important foundation, even though they were not always followed.

In 1254 Jarler sent a letter to  Pope Innocent IV applied for dismissal from his office. He was one of the few Swedish archbishops to have made this request. The reasons he gave were that he was old and crippled. The Pope granted his resignation, but before the message had arrived in 1255, Jarler had already died. He was buried in the Dominican convent church  in Sigtuna.

References

External links 

 Nordisk familjebok, article Vilhelm av Sabina  
 Nordisk familjebok, article Jarler

Other sources
 Åsbrink, Gustav & Westman, Knut B.  Svea rikes ärkebiskopar från 1164 till nuvarande tid (Bokförlaget Natur och Kultur, Stockholm 1935)

Roman Catholic archbishops of Uppsala
13th-century Roman Catholic archbishops in Sweden
1255 deaths
Year of birth unknown